The Ruth Ellis Center is a Detroit area social services agency that serves the needs of runaway, homeless and at-risk lesbian, gay, bisexual, and transgender (LGBT) youth. Among their services are a drop-in center, Street Outreach Program, foster home, and Health and Wellness Center. The center is named after Ruth Ellis in honor of her allowing her home to serve as a refuge for African American gays and lesbians as early as the 1930s. Wanda Sykes is an outspoken supporter of the organization after the staff sent her a letter asking her to visit during her 2010 tour's stop in Detroit.

Programs
The Ruth Ellis Center operates three programs.

Ruth’s House
Residential housing program for LGBT youth ages 12–17 who are in the foster care or juvenile justice system. The youth are referred from the Michigan Department of Human Services, Wayne County Child and Family Services, other Michigan agencies statewide, and youth supervising programs in other states.

The program includes the following services:

Second Stories Drop-In Center
Provides basic services and safe space for youth and young adults ages 14 to 24. Services and resources include full meals, gender identity support groups, laundry facility and clothing, a cyber-center, and recreation.

Second Stories Outpatient Mental Health Services
Provides mental health outpatient services to LGBT youth.

History
A group of community activists - including John Allen, Kofi Adoma, and Courtney Wilson - founded Ruth Ellis Center in 1999, the same year Ruth Ellis was celebrating her 100th birthday. The founders chose to call the program the Ruth Ellis Center in recognition of all the youth Ellis had helped. In September 2000, a 101-year-old Ellis attended the grand opening of the center's first phase, a drop-in center for at-risk youth.

In January 2022 it will open the  Ruth Ellis Clairmount Center, a center for LGBT people from 13 to 30, including housing and educational facilities. The price tag was $15 million.

See also

LGBT rights in Michigan

References

External links

Organizations established in 1999
Organizations based in Detroit
1999 establishments in Michigan
LGBT youth organizations based in the United States
Homeless shelters in the United States
LGBT culture in Detroit
LGBT and homelessness